Bill Murray (born July 3, 1997) is an American football guard for the New England Patriots of the National Football League (NFL). He played college football at William & Mary.

Early life 
Bill was born in Millington, New Jersey to Doug and Alison Murray. At the Delbarton School, Murray played both football and lacrosse. Following his high school success, Murray committed to William & Mary.

College career 
At William & Mary, Murray was a two-time All-CAA selection and a three-year starter who finished his career with 143 tackles, 19 sacks, 10 blocks, four forced fumbles, two fumble recoveries, and six passes defended. Murray was a two-year letter winner and served as a team captain as a senior.

Professional career 
Following his senior year, Murray signed with the New England Patriots as an undrafted free agent in 2020. He spent his entire rookie season on the team's practice squad.

On August 31, 2021, Murray was waived by the Patriots and re-signed to the practice squad.

On February 7, 2022, Murray signed a reserve/future contract. On July 25, 2022, Murray converted from defensive tackle to guard. He was waived on August 30, 2022 and signed to the practice squad the next day. He signed a reserve/future contract on January 24, 2023.

References

External links
New England Patriots bio
William & Mary Tribe bio

1997 births
Living people
American football defensive tackles
Delbarton School alumni
New England Patriots players
People from Long Hill Township, New Jersey
Players of American football from New Jersey
Sportspeople from Morris County, New Jersey
William & Mary Tribe football players